Andrey Rublev defeated Sebastian Korda in the final, 6–2, 6–3 to win the singles tennis title at the 2022 Gijón Open. It was his 12th ATP Tour singles title.

This was the first edition of the tournament.

Seeds
The top four seeds received a bye into the second round.

Draw

Finals

Top half

Bottom half

Qualifying

Seeds

Qualifiers

Lucky loser

Qualifying draw

First qualifier

Second qualifier

Third qualifier

Fourth qualifier

References

External links
 Main draw
 Qualifying draw

2022 ATP Tour
Gijón Open